Mohamed Reda Ouamane (born June 26, 1983 in Oran) is an Algerian football player. He is currently playing for MC Oran in the Algerian Ligue Professionnelle 1.

Club career
Sofiane Bouterbiat return and signed to MC Oran in the summer of 2010, joining them on a free transfer from MC Alger.

External links
 

1983 births
Living people
Footballers from Oran
Algerian footballers
Algerian Ligue Professionnelle 1 players
MC Oran players
MC Alger players
Association football goalkeepers
21st-century Algerian people